Otterville Township is one of fourteen townships in Cooper County, Missouri, USA.  As of the 2000 census, its population was 913.

Geography
According to the United States Census Bureau, Otterville Township covers an area of 27.24 square miles (70.56 square kilometers); of this, 27.24 square miles (70.55 square kilometers, 99.99 percent) is land and 0.01 square miles (0.02 square kilometers, 0.03 percent) is water.

Cities, towns, villages
 Otterville

Unincorporated towns
 Clifton City at 
(This list is based on USGS data and may include former settlements.)

Adjacent townships
 Clear Creek Township (north)
 Lebanon Township (east)
 Richland Township, Morgan County (south)
 Smithton Township, Pettis County (southwest)
 Bowling Green Township, Pettis County (west)
 Heath Creek Township, Pettis County (northwest)

Cemeteries
The township contains these two cemeteries: Saint Josephs and Shackleford.

Major highways
  U.S. Route 50
  Route 135

School districts
 Otterville R-Vi
 Pilot Grove C-4
 Smithton R-Vi

Political districts
 Missouri's 6th congressional district
 State House District 117
 State House District 118
 State Senate District 21
 State Senate District 28

References
 United States Census Bureau 2008 TIGER/Line Shapefiles
 United States Board on Geographic Names (GNIS)
 United States National Atlas

External links
 US-Counties.com
 City-Data.com

Townships in Cooper County, Missouri
Townships in Missouri